Cybill is an American television sitcom created by Chuck Lorre, which aired for four seasons and 87 episodes on CBS from January 2, 1995, to July 13, 1998. Starring Cybill Shepherd, the show revolves around the life of Cybill Sheridan, a twice-divorced single mother of two and struggling actress in her 40s who has never gotten her big break in show business. Alicia Witt and Dedee Pfeiffer co-starred as Sheridan's daughters, with Alan Rosenberg and Tom Wopat playing their respective fathers, while Christine Baranski appeared as Cybill's hard-drinking friend Maryann.

The sitcom was produced by Carsey-Werner Productions and YBYL Productions, with Shepherd, Lorre, Howard M. Gould, Jay Daniel, Caryn Mandabach, Marcy Carsey, and Tom Werner serving as the show's original executive producers. Broadcast to critical praise, Cybill was nominated for 12 Emmy Awards throughout its run and awarded the 1996 Golden Globe Award for Best Television Series – Musical or Comedy. Shepherd won a third Golden Globe Award for her performance, while Baranski received an Emmy, a Screen Actors Guild Award, and an American Comedy Award. Cybill has been in syndication on the comedy-centric digital subchannel LAFF since April 2016, along with other Carsey-Werner Productions series shown on the network.

Plot
Cybill takes place in Los Angeles and focuses on the character of a somewhat faded actress, Cybill Sheridan (played by Cybill Shepherd), who, because of her age, had been relegated to playing character roles, bit parts, and TV commercials. Also featured are her daughters: headstrong Zoey (Witt) and uptight Rachel (Pfeiffer), two ex-husbands: Ira (Rosenberg) and Jeff (Wopat), and her hard-drinking best friend Maryann (Baranski).

Due to the show's premise, many episodes featured a show-within-a-show format, usually in the cold opens, showing Cybill Sheridan playing a variety of other characters in her various film and TV acting roles.

In her autobiography, Cybill Disobedience, Shepherd stated that the Cybill character was based on herself—or at least what her life as an actress could have been without the successes of The Last Picture Show and Moonlighting. Many of the show's details and situations were mined from her own family, marriages, and experiences.

Cast and characters

Regular and semi-regular 
 Cybill Shepherd as Cybill Sheridan – Cybill is a middle aged actress who has had a varied, though mediocre career (which, even in her salad days, seems to have consisted primarily of television commercials, soap operas, and B-movies). She now finds that, due to her age, roles are becoming harder to find and that the quality of roles she is offered is diminishing. Her fortunes seem to vary over the course of the series. Sometimes, she has consistent work and appears to be relatively wealthy, other times, she scrambles to find and keep jobs, and seems to be struggling financially; this inconsistency could be attributed to the nature of her career, as even the most successful actors tend to have their professional ups and downs, both financially and creatively. Cybill is a rather eccentric feminist who practices New Age philosophy, as well as a native Southerner from Memphis, Tennessee. Her loud, public, and honest rantings about female sexuality, her perkiness, bouts of outrage, and hysteria, and her exhibitions of "down-home" Southern behavior often embarrass her two daughters, Zoey and Rachel. Cybill has a civil relationship with her ex-husbands Jeff and Ira, even tolerating their tendency to cling to her. She does sometimes spar, however, with Jeff over his past infidelities, and is quick to remind Ira of how controlling he was when they were married. Cybill's best friend is the wealthy, alcoholic divorcee Maryann Thorpe, whom she supports emotionally and assists in her bitter war with her ex-husband. Cybill has a caustic sense of humor and an acid tongue. Although eccentric and flawed, Cybill's strength and wisdom shines through in her support of her family and friends. (87 episodes)
 Christine Baranski as Maryann Thorpe – Cybill's best friend is a former receptionist who is now fabulously wealthy due to her divorce settlement with her unfaithful ex-husband, celebrity plastic surgeon Richard Thorpe (an infrequently and never fully seen character, to whom she always refers with a sneer as "Dr. Dick"). Maryann is a bored, bitter alcoholic who often seems unstable and emotionally dependent on Cybill. When she is not stalking her ex-husband and playing elaborate and destructive pranks on him, she spends lavishly, drinks, and pursues younger men. She has a few healthy relationships with men of her own age over the course of the series, including Cybill's ex-husband Ira, but these do not last. She has a son, Justin, who infrequently visits. A passionate environmentalist with excessive liberal beliefs, Justin is at odds with her frivolous and extravagant lifestyle. Maryann's most consistent and healthy relationship is with Cybill. They seem to be endlessly sharing martinis in an upmarket Hollywood restaurant and are accomplices in each other's bad behavior. Maryann seems to spend most of her time at Cybill's house and involving herself in Cybill's family life to alleviate her own boredom. Her caustic tongue vies with Cybill's, but her remarks are more inappropriate, bitter, and cynical. She is, however, a constant support for Cybill at crucial moments. Her first name was Theresa, which her mother called her but she dropped when she moved to Los Angeles. (87 episodes)
 Alicia Witt as Zoey Woodbine – Cybill's younger daughter, she is a high-school teenager, and is brilliant, rebellious, and more sarcastic than her mother. She is a piano virtuoso (as is Witt) and hopes to attend the Los Angeles Conservatory of Music. A self-imposed outcast, she is a vocal advocate of celibacy. She is in an on-again-off-again relationship with Maryann's estranged son. (87 episodes)
 Alan Rosenberg as Ira Woodbine – Cybill's second husband, Ira is the polar opposite of Cybill's first husband, Jeff. Unassuming and rather neurotic, he is a brilliant writer, though prone to "writer's block". His marriage to Cybill ended because he was unable to stop trying to control her life; even in divorce, he cannot help meddling in her life. For several episodes of the second season he was involved with Maryann. (85 episodes)
 Dedee Pfeiffer as Rachel Robbins Manning – Cybill's elder daughter, she is uptight and pretentious, and is married to Kevin Manning. She is prone to outbursts of hysteria similar to her mother's, especially during her pregnancies of the first and fourth season. Rachel and Kevin's first child is a boy named William; the second is a girl, Amanda. (Initially a regular but the role became more semi-regular in later seasons) (42 episodes)
Tom Wopat as Jeff Robbins – Cybill's first husband, Jeff is a Hollywood stuntman with a roving eye. Though his many indiscretions were the cause of the divorce, Cybill and Jeff still have a good relationship, bound together by their daughter and grandson (and the fact that Jeff lived over Cybill's garage in the early seasons of the show). Jeff is somewhat dim, making him a prime target for Zoey's dry wit, but possesses a good heart. (Initially a regular in first couple of seasons, semi-regular in later seasons) (22 episodes)

Recurring and special guests 

 Tim Maculan as a waiter and friend of Cybill's. Despite his prominence, the character was never given a name. Appeared in over 50 episodes (the fifth-most appearing cast member with more episodes than some of the semi-regular cast).

 Peter Krause as Kevin Manning, Rachel's equally uptight, untenured assistant professor from Boston. (Recurring from Season 2 onwards) (23 episodes)
Jay Paulson as Sean, Zoe's first boyfriend in Season 2 & 3. (Recurring) (12 episodes)
Ray Baker as the second Dr. Richard Thorpe, Maryann's veterinarian boyfriend who is also the namesake of her ex-husband. (Recurring in Seasons 3 & 4) (11 episodes)
Jane Kaczmarek as Holly, Ira's girlfriend - and later fiancee - in Season 3. (5 episodes)
Linda Wallem appeared in 5 episodes as various characters including Julie, Cybill's co-host on a morning show in 3 episodes. Wallem was also a producer and writer on the show.
Mary Page Keller as Julia Bishop, Zoey's piano teacher and Ira's girlfriend. (4 episodes)
Kim Murphy as Nina, Zoey's friend and one-time roommate. (4 episodes)
Morgan Fairchild as Andrea Thorpe, Cybill's rival and later wife of Maryann's often mentioned but never seen husband, Dr. Dick. Cybill and her have mutual enmity which has resulted in personal humiliations, professional loss, and injury on both sides. (4 episodes)
Audra Lindley as Virginia Sheridan, Cybill's mother. (3 episodes and another episode dedicated in her honour)
Florence Stanley as Ruth Woodbine, Ira's mother and Zoey's grandmother, who had a friendly relationship with Cybill and once posed as Maryann's mother. (3 episodes)
Eileen Heckart as Marge, Maryann's mother. (3 episodes)
Dick O'Neill as Roy, Maryann's father. (3 episodes)

Additionally, many prominent actors appeared playing themselves, often humorous or self-deprecating caricatures of their real personas. These included Jonathan Frakes, Joan Van Ark, Dick Van Patten, Burt Reynolds, and Cybill Shepherd's real-life ex-partner, director Peter Bogdanovich.

Episodes

Ratings

Average seasonal ratings

Cancellation 
The series got respectable (though never spectacular) ratings throughout most of its run, but was abruptly canceled by CBS at the end of the 1997–98 season after a noticeable ratings decline. The show was actually pulled from the CBS schedule after the April 8, 1998 episode had aired; the remaining new episodes that had already been produced were aired over the summer. Shepherd much later alleged that the cancellation occurred because the network was uncomfortable with Cybill'''s feminist leanings and frank depiction of female sexuality.

The cancellation was not expected by the show's staff, as the series ends with a cliffhanger and the words "To Be Continued..." on the screen. At the time of its cancellation, the show's ratings were higher than Nash Bridges (1996-2001) and Chicago Hope (1994-2000); those shows continued to air on CBS. In 2018, Shepherd claimed that Les Moonves hit on her during a dinner date, but she refused him. As a result, he soon interfered with the series' concepts and later canceled it.

 Awards and nominations Cybill was nominated for twelve Emmy Awards throughout its entire run, winning three. Nominated for her performance in each season, Baranski was the only cast member to win an Emmy. Baranski also received an American Comedy Award, a Screen Actors Guild Award and a Viewers for Quality Television Award for her portrayal, while Shepherd was awarded the 1996 Golden Globe Award for Best Actress – Television Series Musical or Comedy. The same year, the sitcom also won the Golden Globe Award for Best Television Series – Musical or Comedy, its only win for both the crew and the cast.

Home media

Region 1
On September 16, 2008, First Look Studios released Cybill: The Collector's Edition, Vol. 1'', a 2-disc best of DVD.

Region 2
Anchor Bay Entertainment has released the entire series on DVD in the UK.

References

External links
 
 
 
 Cybill @ Carsey-Werner
 Carsey-Werner - Cybill

1995 American television series debuts
1998 American television series endings
1990s American sitcoms
Best Musical or Comedy Series Golden Globe winners
CBS original programming
English-language television shows
Primetime Emmy Award-winning television series
Television series about actors
Television series about families
Television series about show business
Television series by Carsey-Werner Productions
Television series created by Chuck Lorre
Television shows set in Los Angeles